Pine Bluff is an unincorporated community in Harrison County, West Virginia, United States.

The community was named for a nearby bluff covered with pine trees.

References

Unincorporated communities in Harrison County, West Virginia
Unincorporated communities in West Virginia
Coal towns in West Virginia